9/7 may refer to:
September 7 (month-day date notation)
July 9 (day-month date notation)